Hamid Rahmanian (born 1968) is a New York–based Iranian multi-disciplinary artist working mostly in cinema, graphic art and shadow  theater. Since the late 1980s, he has combined his love of traditional Persian art forms with modern technology to create new works of art that visually bridge the gaps of East and West.  As a story-teller, his works have focused on people and issues that are rarely covered in the mainstream media, offering audiences new perspectives and intimate glimpses into otherwise little known worlds.

He was educated in Tehran, Iran where he gained his Bachelor of Fine Arts in graphic design from Tehran University. He has worked as a graphic designer since 1987. In 1992, he received the highest honor and was awarded recognition as the youngest professional designer in Iran.  Rahmanian has continued to work as a graphic designer in the US and has been commissioned to do work for cultural organizations and commercial companies including the United Nations, GQ magazine, the Lincoln Center, the Tribeca Film Institute, Pacifica Radio/Democracy Now! and the Eurasia Foundation.

Career 

Rahmanian moved to the United States and earned a Master of Fine Arts in Computer Animation in 1994 from Pratt Institute. His thesis animation The Seventh Day (1996) received The First place College Award from the Academy of Television Arts and Sciences, was nominated for a Student Academy Award and was in competition at Annecy International Animation Festival. In 1996, he was the youngest recipient ever to receive the National Interest Waiver from the U.S. for his outstanding work as an artist. After completing his studies, he was hired by Disney Feature Animation Company as a Look Development Artist where he worked on Tarzan, The Emperor's New Groove, and Dinosaur. In 1998, Mr. Rahmanian left Disney and established his own production company, Fictionville Studio.  His first 35 mm short film An I Within (1999), received Kodak's Best Cinematography Award, Best American Short from the LA International Short Film Festival and Special Achievement Award from the USA Film Festival. He went on to make three documentaries. Breaking Bread (2000) and Sir Alfred Of Charles De Gaulle Airport (2001) were well received by the media and worldwide audiences.  Shahrbanoo (2002) first premiered on PBS station WNET where it received among the highest ratings for an independently produced documentary and has been broadcast on networks around the globe.  His first feature length fiction film Dame sobh (2005) (Persian: دم صبح, Dam-e Sobh, English title: Day Break) premiered at the Toronto International Film Festival, went on to screen at festivals and theaters all over the world, including the Venice Film Festival and Tribeca Film Festival and won Special Jury Prize at the International Film Festival of Prime in 2006.  Variety called it, "An impressive debut feature that works like a ticking time bomb". The Glass House (2008 film) a feature-length documentary premiered at the Sundance Film Festival and International Documentary Festival  in Amsterdam and was the winner of the Organization for Security and Cooperation in Europe's (OSCE) Human Rights Award, among other awards.

Rahmanian's films have consistently sought to combat negative stereotypes about Iranians, to promote anti-capital punishment laws in the US, and to raise funds and awareness for the plights of disadvantaged women and girls around the world. His films have been televised on international networks, including PBS, Sundance Channel, IFC, Channel 4, BBC, DR2, and Al Jazeera.

In 2003, Rahmanian co-founded and was President (2004–2007) ArteEast, a leading New York-based nonprofit organization dedicated to engaging a growing global audience with the contemporary arts of the Middle East and North Africa.
In 2009, he wrote and illustrated a graphic autobiography entitled To Myself With Love of which the illustrations were an exhibition called MULTIVERSE at the Halsey Institute of Contemporary Art in 2011. In 2013, Rahmanian illustrated and commissioned a new translation, translated by Dr. Ahmad Sadri, and adaptation of the tenth-century Persian epic poem Shahnameh by Ferdowsi, entitled Shahnameh: The Epic Of The Persian Kings.  This best-selling, 600 page art book, which according to the Wall Street Journal, is a "Masterpiece," published by The Quantuck Lane Press and distributed by W. W. Norton & Company.  The limited edition version of the book was exhibited at the Library of Congress in 2014 as part of their "1000 years of the Persian Book"  exhibition.

Rahmanian has been awarded a 2014 John Simon Guggenheim Fellow Award.

Rahmanian began experimenting with shadow theater techniques in 2014.  He created a short 20-minute shadow play with overhead projectors titled Zahhak: The Legend of the Serpent King, based on a fable from the Shahnameh.  It premiered at the Asia Society in New York City and later on the Brooklyn Academy of Music and the Freer Gallery of Art and the Arthur M. Sackler Gallery of the Smithsonian Institution.

In 2016, Rahmanian created, designed and directed the stage production of Feathers of Fire, an adaption of the Persian love story of Zaul and Rudabeh from the Shahnameh.   This "jaw-dropping" live animation-like shadow play incorporated shadow casters, puppets, digitally projected animation and music to create a "feast for the senses" according to Puppetry International Magazine.  Le Figaro called it "astonishing and magical" and NYC Theater Review exclaimed that it was a "masterpiece".  The play premiered at the Brooklyn Academy of Music. It played at the Metropolitan Museum of Art and toured around the world between 2016 and 2018. That same year, he was commissioned by the Onassis Foundation to write and direct a shadow play based the Greek tragedy of Antigone, called Mina's Dream.

In 2017, he released an immersive audiobook version of Shahnameh: The Epic of the Persian Kings with an introduction by Frances Ford Coppola.  In 2018, Rahmanian released the pop up book Zahhak: The Legend of the Serpent King through Fantagraphics Books. The book which Le Monde called "simply breathtaking" won the 2018 Meggendorfer Prize for the Best Pop Up Book.  The French publication La Croix called it "magnificent" and the New York Journal of Books said it was a "book that demands respect." The book was published in French and English.

In 2019, Rahmanian collaborated with Keyhan Kalhor and the Silk Road Ensemble on their project, Heroes Take Their Stand, where he created a 23-minute animation about the life of the Persian hero Siavosh from Shahnameh.

Personal life 

Rahmanian is married to Melissa Hibbard, his creative partner, a photographer and a filmmaker, with whom he has a daughter Sophie.

Bibliography 

 Shahnameh: The Epic of the Persian Kings The Illustrated edition 2013
 To Myself with Love 2006 (to be published)
 Zahhak: The Legend of The Serpent King (pop up book) 2018

Filmography 

 The Seventh Day (1996)
 An I Within (1999)
 Breaking Bread (2000)
 Sir Alfred of Charles de Gaulle Airport (2001)
 Shahrbanoo (2002)
 Day Break (2005)
 The Glass House (2008)

Stage Plays 
 Zahhak: The Legend of the Serpent King (2014)
 Feathers of Fire (2016)
 Mina's Dream (2016)
 Song of the North (in production)

References

External links 

 
 www.fictionvillestudio.com
 www.theepicofthepersiankings.com
 www.kingorama.com

Living people
1968 births
Iranian emigrants to the United States
American graphic designers
Iranian documentary filmmakers
University of Tehran alumni
Pratt Institute alumni